Epidromia lienaris is a moth of the family Erebidae first described by Jacob Hübner in 1823. It is found from southern Florida and Arizona southward through the Caribbean and Central America to Peru and Brazil and the Galápagos Islands.

The larvae feed on Psidium longipes, Psidium guajava, Eugenia axillaris, Metopium toxiferum and Rhus copallina.

Taxonomy
Both Epidromia rotundata and Epidromia pannosa where formerly listed as synonyms, but are now considered distinct.

References

Moths described in 1823
Calpinae